Daniel Lascau (born 15 May 1969) is a German judoka. He competed in the men's half-middleweight event at the 1992 Summer Olympics.

References

External links
 

1969 births
Living people
German male judoka
Olympic judoka of Germany
Judoka at the 1992 Summer Olympics
Sportspeople from Oradea
20th-century German people